Broken Oath is a 1977 Hong Kong Mandarin-language kung fu film directed by Jeong Chang-hwa, a South Korean director. The film was produced by Golden Harvest.

Plot 
A woman lies dying in a women's prison after giving birth and recounts to a pickpocket how she ended up there after her husband was murdered by thugs, one of whom also raped her. The pickpocket agrees to raise her daughter to seek revenge, but in hopes of breaking the cycle of violence she hands the infant girl over to a Shaolin monastery for women. 'Pure Lotus' Liu (Angela Mao) grows up to be a troubled young woman who skips out on Buddhist lessons, but excels at kung fu. She's kicked out after killing several thugs and rejoins the pickpocket, where she discovers the truth about her parents. Using her kung fu and deadly scorpions, Lotus begins a systematic hunt for each of the men who assaulted her family and ends up joining forces with government agents to uproot rebels, two of whom are her targets.

Cast
This is a partial list of cast.
 Angela Mao - Liu Chieh Lien, Lotus.
 Michael Chan - Zhao Cai, Chao Tsai.
 Bruce Leung - Chen Bang, Chang Pang.
 Kuo Cheng-Yu - Imperial undercover agent
 Guan Shan - Liu Da Xiong, General Liu.
 Chao Hsiung - Hao Shi, Hao Chi.
 Fong Yau - Dou Qi, To Chi.
 Chang Pei-Shan - Chou Kui, General Tiu
 Ha Yue - Ah Shu
 Tony Lou Chun-Ku - Chou's assistant
 Sze-Ma Wah-Lung - Mr Wong
 Wang Lai - Thousand Hands
 Lee Wan-Chung - Hao's assistant
 Dean Shek - Brothel manager
 Ho Mei - Mrs Liu Yee Mei
 Sammo Hung - Starknife bodyguard
 Han Ying-Chieh - Fire-breathing bodyguard
 Yeung Wai - Imperial undercover agent
 Yuen Wah - One of Hao's men/One of Chou's guards
 San Kuai - One of Hao's men
 Wong Mei - One of Hao's men
 Corey Yuen - One of Chou's guards / Hao's bodyguard
 Mars - One of Chou's guards
 Chin Yuet-Sang - One of Chou's guards
 Yuen Biao - One of Qi's men 
 Alan Chui Chung-San - One of Qi's men
 Alan Chan Kwok-Kuen - One of Qi's men
 Hsu Hsia - One of Qi's men
 Chin Chun - Guard leader
 Lee Hang - One of Hao's men
 Chu Yau-Ko - Hungry man at inn

See also 
 Lady Snowblood (film)

References

External links
 Broken Oath at Hong Kong Cinemagic
 
 

1977 films
Hong Kong martial arts films
Golden Harvest films
Kung fu films
Films directed by Jeong Chang-hwa
1970s Hong Kong films